William P. Magee Jr. an American plastic and craniofacial surgeon, founded Operation Smile in 1982, with his wife, Kathleen S. Magee, B.S.N., M.Ed., M.S.W., and serves as the organization's Chief Executive Officer. Operation Smile is a private, non-profit volunteer medical services organization providing reconstructive surgery and related health care to indigent children and young adults in developing countries and the United States.

In addition to leading the organization as CEO, Magee also trains international physicians in craniofacial techniques through Operation Smile's annual Physician's Training Program. In 1999, the Magees envisioned and launched World Journey of Hope '99, the largest surgical mission in history dedicated to correcting facial deformities among some of the world's neediest children. The nine-week mission, the first-ever of its kind, transformed the lives of more than 5,300 children and young adults in 17 developing countries and in 10 cities across the United States.

Magee's compensation from Operation Smile, Inc. was $517,944 for the year ending June 30, 2017; $518,471 for year ending June 30, 2016; $350,000 for the year ending June 30, 2014 according to the IRS Form 990 filed by Operation Smile, Inc. According to nonprofit tracker guidestar.org this salary level compared to total donations is considered highly above normal. He has a very large family including his wife Kathy, his 5 children. Grandchildren including Riley, Will, Alec, and Isabelle Clifford.

According to the IRS Form 990 for 2012 Magee was paid $355,685 in reportable compensation by Operation Smile, Inc. for the year ending June 30, 2013.

Biography

Magee attended Mount St. Mary's University before medical school at George Washington University and dental school at the University of Maryland. After completing his general surgery residency at the University of Virginia, he came to the EVMS for a plastic surgery fellowship (EVMS no longer offers a plastic surgery fellowship). He is certified by the American Board of Plastic Surgery and specializes in cleft lip, cleft palate, craniofacial deformities, and hemangiomas. He is currently employed at the Children's Hospital of the King's Daughters, and simultaneously runs his practice, Magee-Rosenblum Plastic Surgery, in Norfolk, Newport News, and Chesapeake, Virginia. Magee is also an associate professor at Eastern Virginia Medical School.

Awards and honors

Magee's work on behalf of children around the world has led to the receipt of numerous awards and honors, including:

Conrad N. Hilton Humanitarian Prize - 1996
Servants of Peace Award - 1997
Golden Plate Award of the American Academy of Achievement - 1999
Common Wealth Award of Distinguished Service - 2001
Antonio Feltrinelli Prize for Exceptional Endeavors of Outstanding Moral and Humanitarian Value - 2001
Frank Annunzio Award - 2002
Medical Mission Hall of Fame induction - 2003
The Humanitarian Rose Award - 2004
President's Call to Service Award - 2007

References

American plastic surgeons
George Washington University School of Medicine & Health Sciences alumni
University of Maryland, College Park alumni
American nonprofit chief executives
Living people
People from Norfolk, Virginia
Year of birth missing (living people)
Fordham Preparatory School alumni